Purine is a heterocyclic aromatic organic compound that consists of two rings (pyrimidine and imidazole) fused together. It is water-soluble. Purine also gives its name to the wider class of molecules, purines, which include substituted purines and their tautomers. They are the most widely occurring nitrogen-containing heterocycles in nature.

Dietary sources 
Purines are found in high concentration in meat and meat products, especially internal organs such as liver and kidney. In general, plant-based diets are low in purines. High-purine plants and algae include some legumes  (lentils and black eye peas) and spirulina. Examples of high-purine sources include: sweetbreads, anchovies, sardines, liver, beef kidneys, brains, meat extracts (e.g., Oxo, Bovril), herring, mackerel, scallops, game meats, yeast (beer, yeast extract, nutritional yeast) and gravy.

A moderate amount of purine is also contained in red meat, beef, pork, poultry, fish and seafood, asparagus, cauliflower, spinach, mushrooms, green peas, lentils, dried peas, beans, oatmeal, wheat bran, wheat germ, and haws.

Biochemistry 
Purines and pyrimidines make up the two groups of nitrogenous bases, including the two groups of nucleotide bases. The purine  bases are guanine (G) and adenine (A) which form corresponding nucleosides-deoxyribonucleosides (deoxyguanosine  and deoxyadenosine) with deoxyribose moiety and ribonucleosides (guanosine,  adenosine) with ribose moiety. These nucleosides with phosphoric acid form corresponding nucleotides (deoxyguanylate, deoxyadenylate and guanylate, adenylate)  which are  the  building blocks of DNA and RNA, respectively. Purine bases also play an essential role in many metabolic and signalling processes within the compounds guanosine monophosphate  (GMP) and adenosine monophosphate (AMP).

In order to perform these essential cellular processes, both purines and pyrimidines are needed by the cell, and in similar quantities. Both purine and pyrimidine are self-inhibiting and activating. When purines are formed, they inhibit the enzymes required for more purine formation. This self-inhibition occurs as they also activate the enzymes needed for pyrimidine formation. Pyrimidine simultaneously self-inhibits and activates purine in similar manner. Because of this, there is nearly an equal amount of both substances in the cell at all times.

Properties
Purine is both a very weak acid (pKa 8.93) and an even weaker base (pKa 2.39). If dissolved in pure water, the pH is half way between these two pKa values.

Purine is aromatic, having four tautomers each with a hydrogen bonded to a different one of the four nitrogen atoms. These are identified as 1-H, 3-H, 7-H, and 9-H (see image of numbered ring). The common crystalline form favours the 7-H tautomer, while in polar solvents both the 9-H and 7-H tautomers predominate. Substituents to the rings and interactions with other molecules can shift the equilibrium of these tautomers.

Notable purines
There are many naturally occurring purines.  They include the nucleobases adenine (2) and guanine (3). In DNA, these bases form hydrogen bonds with their complementary pyrimidines, thymine and cytosine, respectively. This is called complementary base pairing. In RNA, the complement of adenine is uracil instead of thymine.

Other notable purines are hypoxanthine, xanthine, theophylline, theobromine, caffeine, uric acid and isoguanine.

Functions

Aside from the crucial roles of purines (adenine and guanine) in DNA and RNA, purines are also significant components in a number of other important biomolecules, such as ATP, GTP, cyclic AMP, NADH, and coenzyme A. Purine (1) itself, has not been found in nature, but it can be produced by organic synthesis.

They may also function directly as neurotransmitters, acting upon purinergic receptors. Adenosine activates adenosine receptors.

History 
The word purine (pure urine) was coined by the German chemist Emil Fischer in 1884. He synthesized it for the first time in 1898. The starting material for the reaction sequence was uric acid (8), which had been isolated from kidney stones by Carl Wilhelm Scheele in 1776. Uric acid (8) was reacted with PCl5 to give 2,6,8-trichloropurine (10), which was converted with HI and PH4I to give 2,6-diiodopurine (11). The product was reduced to purine (1) using zinc dust.

Metabolism 

Many organisms have metabolic pathways to synthesize and break down purines.

Purines are biologically synthesized as nucleosides (bases attached to ribose).

Accumulation of modified purine nucleotides is defective to various cellular processes, especially those involving DNA and RNA. To be viable, organisms possess a number of deoxypurine phosphohydrolases, which hydrolyze these purine derivatives removing them from the active NTP and dNTP pools. Deamination of purine bases can result in accumulation of such nucleotides as ITP, dITP, XTP and dXTP.

Defects in enzymes that control purine production and breakdown can severely alter a cell's DNA sequences, which may explain why people who carry certain genetic variants of purine metabolic enzymes have a higher risk for some types of cancer.

Purine biosynthesis in the three domains of life
Organisms in all three domains of life, eukaryotes, bacteria and archaea, are able to carry out de novo biosynthesis of purines.  This ability reflects the essentiality of purines for life.  The biochemical pathway of synthesis is very similar in eukaryotes and bacterial species, but is more variable among archaeal species.  A nearly complete, or complete, set of genes required for purine biosynthesis was determined to be present in 58 of the 65 archaeal species studied.  However, also identified were seven archaeal species with entirely, or nearly entirely, absent purine encoding genes.  Apparently the archaeal species unable to synthesize purines are able to acquire exogenous purines for growth., and are thus analogous to purine mutants of eukaryotes, e.g. purine mutants of the Ascomycete fungus Neurospora crassa, that also require exogenous purines for growth.

Relationship with gout 

Higher levels of meat and seafood consumption are associated with an increased risk of gout, whereas a higher level of consumption of dairy products is associated with a decreased risk. Moderate intake of purine-rich vegetables or protein is not associated with an increased risk of gout.  Similar results have been found with the risk of hyperuricemia.

Laboratory synthesis
In addition to in vivo synthesis of purines in purine metabolism, purine can also be created artificially.

Purine (1) is obtained in good yield when formamide is heated in an open vessel at 170 °C for 28 hours.

This remarkable reaction and others like it have been discussed in the context of the origin of life.

Patented August 20, 1968, the current recognized method of industrial-scale production of adenine is a modified form of the formamide method. This method heats up formamide under 120 degree Celsius conditions within a sealed flask for 5 hours to form adenine. The reaction is heavily increased  in quantity by using a phosphorus oxychloride (phosphoryl chloride) or phosphorus pentachloride as an acid catalyst and sunlight or ultraviolet conditions. After the 5 hours have passed and the formamide-phosphorus oxychloride-adenine solution cools down, water is put into the flask containing the formamide and now-formed adenine. The water-formamide-adenine solution is then poured through a filtering column of activated charcoal. The water and formamide molecules, being small molecules, will pass through the charcoal and into the waste flask; the large adenine molecules, however, will attach or “adsorb” to the charcoal due to the van der waals forces that interact between the adenine and the carbon in the charcoal. Because charcoal has a large surface area, it's able to capture the majority of molecules that pass a certain size (greater than water and formamide) through it. To extract the adenine from the charcoal-adsorbed adenine, ammonia gas dissolved in water (aqua ammonia) is poured onto the activated charcoal-adenine structure to liberate the adenine into the ammonia-water solution. The solution containing water, ammonia, and adenine is then left to air dry, with the adenine losing solubility due to the loss of ammonia gas that previously made the solution basic and capable of dissolving adenine, thus causing it to crystallize into a pure white powder that can be stored.

Oro, Orgel and co-workers have shown that four molecules of HCN tetramerize to form diaminomaleodinitrile (12), which can be converted into almost all naturally occurring purines. For example, five molecules of HCN condense in an exothermic reaction to make adenine, especially in the presence of ammonia.

The Traube purine synthesis (1900) is a classic reaction (named after Wilhelm Traube) between an amine-substituted pyrimidine and formic acid.

Prebiotic synthesis of purine ribonucleosides

In order to understand how life arose, knowledge is required of the chemical pathways that permit formation of the key building blocks of life under plausible prebiotic conditions.  Nam et al. demonstrated the direct condensation of purine and pyrimidine nucleobases with ribose to give ribonucleosides in aqueous microdroplets, a key step leading to RNA formation. Also, a plausible prebiotic process for synthesizing purine ribonucleosides was presented by Becker et al.

See also 
 Purinones
 Pyrimidine
 Simple aromatic rings
 Transition
 Transversion
 Gout, a disorder of purine metabolism
Adenine
Guanine

References

External links 
 Purine Content in Food

 
Simple aromatic rings
1898 in science
Emil Fischer